Fairoz Khan (born 21 March 1989) is an activist and former president of the National Students' Union of India. On 11 April 2022, Fairoz Khan has been appointed as Working President of Pradesh Youth Congress J&K.

Early life
Fairoz Khan was born to Muzaffer Ahmed Khan, an engineer, on 21 March 1989, in the village of Pogal Paristan in Ramban District, Jammu and Kashmir, India.  Khan completed his primary and secondary education in Ramban, Banihal and Udhampur. He graduated with a Bachelor of Science from the Government Degree Graduate College Bhaderwah and a Bachelor of Law and Masters of Arts in Political Science from Jammu University.  At the university, he was an active student leader and protested against "anti-student" policies.

Political activities
Khan was appointed National Secretary of the NSUI on 16 December 2012, from a field of 120 candidates, following the final approval of Rahul Gandhi. Khan campaigned against cheating in exams organised by the Jammu and Kashmir Services Selection Board (JKSSB), for the implementation of the Right of Children to Free and Compulsory Education Act in Jammu and Kashmir and supported relief efforts following the Kashmir floods of September 2014. On 22 June 2017, at the age of 28, Khan was sworn in as the president of the National Students' Union of India (NSUI). He was the first Kashmiri to hold this post.

NSUI resignation
On 16 October 2018, Khan resigned after he was accused of sexual harassment. He was accused by a female Congress party member from Chhattisgarh. A three-member committee was convened to investigate the matter. Khan denied the charges. The woman had first complained against Khan to Rahul Gandhi in June 2018. She also demanded protection, as she feared for her life.

References

1989 births
Living people
20th-century Indian lawyers
Jammu and Kashmir politicians
University of Jammu alumni
National Students' Union of India